Kal Kent is a superhero who appears in the DC Comics, created by Grant Morrison. He is the Superman of the 853rd century. He is also a descendant of the original Superman himself. He first appeared in JLA #15 (February 1998).

Fictional character biography

DC One Million
In the 853rd century, the progenitor of the Superman Dynasty, Superman Kal-El, is about to return from his solar Fortress of Solitude after several centuries. As part of the festivities, the Justice Legion Alpha went back in time to recruit the ancient Justice League of America. The current Legion had counterparts to the League except for Green Lantern (they had the future Starman instead). After arriving at the end of the 20th century, Kal Kent and the Justice Legion convinced the League to go the future and participate in trials as part of the celebration. Before they leave, Kal helps Superman stop a Belle-Reve prison riot; during this incident he references fighting the Chronovore with the Superman Squad.

Following the League's departure, Hourman releases the "Hourman virus" which infects not only people, but technology. It is revealed that the virus is Solaris' artificial intelligence in its infancy. The virus is spreading because Solaris is looking in all technology and organisms for its body. To cure the world and save it from Solaris, the JL-Alpha has to create Solaris. Once in his body, Solaris becomes self-aware, with his intelligence increasing with every passing second. Starman sacrifices himself in order to banish Solaris by creating a black hole. With the JL-Alpha's time machine unable to reach the 853rd century, Superman Secundus is able to punch through the time barrier to bring the Legion back to the 853rd century. They arrive in time for Superman-Prime's arrival and the final destruction of Solaris.

All-Star Superman

Kal Kent is shown in a holographic communication unit, as Superman is trying to communicate with the future. Due to technological limitations, only fragments come through, Kal is shown talking about the Superman Dynasty's feud with Solaris. He makes his first appearance leading a group of time-traveling Superman Squad members against the time-eating Chronovore in Smallville the day Jonathan Kent dies of a heart attack.

Powers and abilities
Kal Kent has Kryptonian powers that have evolved into the far future. His default Kryptonian powers (superhuman strength, invulnerability, superhuman speed, superhuman senses, vortex breath, arctic breath, flight, x-ray vision, and heat vision) appear on par with the vastly powerful Silver Age Superman. Due to other alien/extradimensional/supernatural admixtures in the Superman Dynasty bloodline, he also has additional powers such as superhuman ESP, force vision, telepathy, electromagnetic manipulation, and an additional 10 senses.  Kal gets the energy for his main powers from the original Superman Kal-El and Earth's Super-Sun, resulting in him gradually losing his powers when he is in the past. This future descendant of Superman has stated that he himself is "faster than a speeding tachyon, more powerful than a collapsing star, and able to leap between planets in a single bound". When trapped in the 20th century, he displayed the ability to punch his way through time using the basic time portal Steel had assembled using plans acquired from the Lord of Time, although this was exhausting and nearly drained him down to the last dregs of his power before he reached his home century. Finally his agility, extrasensory, and visionary power are nearly incalculable. He is also immune to Kryptonite, Red sun light/radiation, and possibly psionics. He is also as smart as Brainiac 5 if not more so as the future Flash John Fox once stated he is able to calculate over a billion scenarios simultaneously. Although others have developed into a superhuman race as well, Superman promised his successors greater powers if they pledged to always protect Earth and the solar system.

In other media
Kal Kent appears in a cameo in the animated film All-Star Superman as one of Superman's descendants from the far future. In the film, Superman shows Lois Lane on his time telescope Kal Kent, who has just fought Darkseid. Lois points out to Superman that Kal resembles her father, to which Superman just smiles.

References

External links

Characters created by Grant Morrison
Comics characters introduced in 1998
DC Comics characters who can move at superhuman speeds
DC Comics characters who have mental powers
DC Comics characters with superhuman senses
DC Comics characters with superhuman strength
DC Comics male superheroes 
DC Comics superheroes
DC Comics hybrids
DC Comics telepaths
Fictional characters with slowed ageing
Fictional characters with superhuman durability or invulnerability
Fictional characters with X-ray vision
Fictional characters with nuclear or radiation abilities
Fictional characters from parallel universes
Fictional characters with air or wind abilities
Fictional characters with ice or cold abilities
Fictional characters with absorption or parasitic abilities
Fictional characters with energy-manipulation abilities
Fictional characters with fire or heat abilities
Fictional characters with electric or magnetic abilities
Fictional technopaths
Kryptonians
Superman characters